The Safien Valley (Safiental) is an alpine valley of the Canton of Graubünden, Switzerland, branching off the Vorderrhein valley. Part of the  Surselva district, it comprises the municipality of Safiental, which was created from the four former municipalities of Valendas, Versam, Tenna and Safien on 1 January 2013. The valley was settled by German speaking Walser people in the late 13th century, and today has a population of just above 1,000.

History
Historically economically used by Romansh speakers without settlements, the inner part of the valley was settled by German speaking Walser people in the late 13th century. Population fell from 1,798 in 1850 to 994 in 1980 and has since stabilized just above 1,000.

Geology
From the Ruinaulta gorge formed by the Rhine at about 620 Meters above the Sea, the public road into the valley ends after some 22 kilometers at a Level of 1720 meters. The mountains on the much steeper eastern flank of the valley reach roughly 3000 Meters (Bruschghorn, Piz Beverin). The western side of the valley is less steep but reaches 2900 meters at Piz Tomül in the southwestern part and Piz Fess in its northern pert as well.

References

External links 

 http://www.safiental.ch

Valleys of Graubünden
Valleys of the Alps
Alpine Rhine basin
Safiental